Paget Valerie Brewster (born March 10, 1969) is an American actress and singer. She was first recognized for her recurring role as Kathy on the fourth season of the NBC sitcom Friends. Her breakthrough role came as FBI Supervisory Special Agent Emily Prentiss on the CBS crime drama Criminal Minds. She was a regular cast member on the series from 2006 to 2012, then made two guest appearances before returning as a regular in 2016.

Her other roles include voicing Elise and Mr. Mumbles on Dan Vs., portraying Debra Chambers and Frankie Dart in the fifth and sixth seasons of Community, respectively, and voicing Judy Ken Sebben / Birdgirl in Harvey Birdman, Attorney at Law and Birdgirl. Brewster has also played Sara Kingsley on the Fox sitcom Grandfathered and voiced Donald Duck's twin sister Della in the 2017 series of DuckTales.

Early life
Brewster was born March 10, 1969, in Concord, Massachusetts. Both her mother, Hathaway Brewster ( Tew), and father, Galen Brewster, worked as school administrators at Middlesex School.

Brewster grew up in Massachusetts and moved to New York City to attend Parsons School of Design. During her first year, she made her acting debut and eventually dropped out of design school to pursue her acting career. In the mid 1990s, Brewster moved to San Francisco and enrolled in acting classes.

Career
Between 1994 and 1995, Brewster hosted a late-night talk show in the San Francisco Bay Area called Paget for 65 episodes at KPIX-TV. She first came to prominent attention in her recurring role as Kathy in the fourth season of NBC's Friends. She appeared in Andy Richter Controls the Universe and Huff. On film she played Ms. Indestructible, the female lead in James Gunn's low-budget superhero comedy The Specials (2000). She played Amy Pierson, a calculus teacher afraid of the water, in the independent film The Big Bad Swim, which premiered at the 2006 Tribeca Film Festival.

In 2005, she began voice work as Judy Ken Sebben / Birdgirl, a recurring character on the animated series Harvey Birdman, Attorney at Law (and later played a similar guest character on American Dad!).

Brewster had a long run with the show Criminal Minds, playing multilingual Supervisory Special Agent Emily Prentiss until the show's sixth season, when she and A. J. Cook were released from their contracts by CBS in a cost-cutting move. Owing to complaints from fans, both she and Cook were rehired and kept for the following season. In February 2012, Brewster announced via Deadline that she was leaving Criminal Minds at the end of the season to return to her comedic and sitcom roots. Brewster reprised her role as Emily Prentiss in season nine for the 200th episode, and season 11 as a special guest star. In 2016, Brewster returned to Criminal Minds once again as a series regular.

Brewster subsequently portrayed bureau chief PDA Paula Foster in the Public Integrity Unit of the District Attorney's office on NBC's long-running police drama Law & Order: Special Victims Unit. Her character handled the case against SVU commanding officer Captain Donald Cragen (Dann Florek), suspected of murder after awakening next to a dead woman in the 13th-season finale.

Brewster was a regular on The Thrilling Adventure Hour, a staged production in the style of old-time radio that was recorded monthly at Largo in Los Angeles. She played the recurring character of Sadie Doyle, the alcoholic socialite who can communicate with the supernatural alongside her husband, Frank (Paul F. Tompkins), in the "Beyond Belief" segments. In early April 2013, Brewster appeared in Modern Family as Trish in episode 20, "Flip Flop", playing an art expert who is dating Gloria's ex-husband, Javier. In August 2013, Brewster appeared in episode 106 of the Drunk History television series on Comedy Central. In January 2015, Brewster began appearing on Community. In February 2014, it was announced that she had been cast in a new ABC comedy called St. Francis. In August 2016, it was announced that she would be reprising her role as Emily Prentiss on Criminal Minds and would once again be a series regular. Brewster also regularly appears on Will You Accept This Rose, a Nerdist podcast hosted by Arden Myrin about The Bachelor franchise.

Personal life
On the March 30, 2006, episode of Late Night with Conan O'Brien, Brewster revealed that she had received a handwritten note indicating Hugh Hefner would like her to pose for Playboy. She seriously considered the offer, but even though she said that she admired Playboy more than magazines such as Maxim and FHM, and her parents gave her their blessing, she eventually turned it down.

She has volunteered as an actress with the Los Angeles Young Storytellers Program.

On March 17, 2013, Brewster became engaged to Steve Damstra, a member of the bands Folded Light and Whirlwind Heat. Brewster and Damstra married on November 28, 2014, in Los Angeles, in a ceremony officiated by Matthew Gray Gubler, their close friend and Brewster's Criminal Minds co-star. , the couple resides in Los Angeles.

Filmography

Film

Television

Web

References

External links
 
 
 
 

20th-century American actresses
20th-century American singers
20th-century American women singers
21st-century American actresses
21st-century American women singers
Actresses from Massachusetts
American film actresses
American stage actresses
American television actresses
American voice actresses
Living people
People from Concord, Massachusetts
Television personalities from San Francisco
1969 births